Mogoytuy is the name of several inhabited localities in Russia.

Urban localities
Mogoytuy, Mogoytuysky District, Zabaykalsky Krai, an urban-type settlement in Mogoytuysky District, Zabaykalsky Krai